Fashion and clothing in the Philippines refers to the way the people of the Philippine society generally dress up at home, at work, travelling and during special occasions.

The clothing style and fashion sense of the Philippines in the modern-day era have been influenced by the indigenous tribes, Chinese waves of immigration, the Spaniards, and the Americans, as evidenced by the chronology of events that occurred in Philippine history. At present, Filipinos conform their way of dressing based on classic fashion or prevailing fashion trends. 

Apart from Western influence, the Philippine style of clothing was dictated by its climate. With a tropical climate (dry and rainy seasons), indigenous groups wore and to this day still wear colorful woven clothes, often with intricate beadwork and other ornam a type of a collarless shirt – which later became adorned with laces, trimmings, buttons, and a collar – was where from the Barong Tagalog evolved. On the other hand, the Bahag was a type of loincloth or G-string worn by certain indigenous groups.

Some Filipinos wear T-shirts together with denim jeans (locally referred to as maong) trousers for men and skirts for women. The "jeans and T-shirts" combination was introduced to the Filipinos by the Americans. 

Some also wear Madras type of shorts called puruntongs (singular: puruntong, a type of pair of shorts or Capri pants) combined with sleeveless shirts or T-shirts. During the rainy season and cold evenings in December and January, some Filipinos wear hooded jackets.

Evolution of Philippine fashion

Pre-Spanish period
During the period before the Spanish arrived to the islands, the different tribes and kingdoms wore their respective clothing. The Filipino style of clothing had been dictated by the tropical climate in the Philippines, with a dry and rainy season. Early Filipinos – as well as the still extant tribal groups in the Philippines – wore colorful woven clothes, often with "intricate beadwork" and other ornaments. 
The men wore pants or a loincloth, as  while women wore a robe-like dress.

Prior to the emergence of the Spanish Philippines, the Tagalogs of Luzon already wore a garment that was a forerunner of the Barong Tagalog – the Baro. Earliest reference to the Baro was in the historical account describes that the Luzones wore a sleeve-doublet of rough cotton cloth called kanga, reaching slightly below the waist. It was collarless and had an opening in front. The doublets indicated the social status and badge of courage of a man; red was for the Chiefs and the bravest, while black and white were for the ordinary citizens. Their loins were covered with colored Bahague between legs to mid-thigh.

The early pre-Philippines clothing of the indigenous groups such as the Tagalogs and Visayans included both the baro and saya made from silk in matching colours. This style was exclusively worn by the women from the upper caste, while those of lower castes wore baro made from pounded white bark fiber, and a floor-length wrap-around skirt. Women usually wore jewelry, such as gold necklaces and earrings, which symbolized wealth and beauty. In some tribes, women also wore tattoos signifying beauty, power and wealth.In contrast, the Visayans wore clothes similar to that of Indonesians and Malaysians. They wore a robe called Marlota or jacket called Baquero without a collar that reached the feet. The robes or jackets were brightly coloured. The Tagalogs and the Visayans bound their foreheads and temples with long, narrow strips of cloth called Putong. Necks were covered with gold necklaces, and wrists with golden armlets called Calombigas – these had intricate patterns. Others would wear precious stones.The usual male headdress was the pudong, a turban; though in Panay, both men and women also wore a head cloth or bandana called saplung. Commoners wore pudong of rough abaca cloth wrapped around only a few turns so that it was more of a headband than a turban and was therefore called pudong-pudong – as the crowns and diadems on Christian images were later called. A red pudong was called magalong, and was the insignia of braves who had killed an enemy.

When Humabon's queen went to hear mass during Magellan's visit, she was preceded by three girls carrying one of her hats. A headdress from Cebu with a deep crown, used by both sexes for travel on foot or by boat, was called sarok, which actually meant to go for water.

The Islamic kingdoms in Mindanao especially the Maranao people have a fashion article for the female called malong, which is a tubeskirt or a light blanket wrapped around the body. More prestigious clothes, lihin-lihin, were added for public appearances and especially on formal occasions – blouses and tunics, loose smocks with sleeves, capes, or ankle-length robes.

Spanish period 
When the Spaniards came and settled in the country, the fashion changed drastically as the Spanish culture influenced the succeeding centuries of Philippine history. The Spanish dissolved the kingdoms and united the country, resulting in a mixture of cultures from different ethnic groups and Spanish culture.

Throughout the 16th century up to the 18th century, women wore a Hispanicized version of the Baro't saya, composed of a bodice – called a camisa, often made in pineapple fiber or muslin – and a floor length skirt, while the men wore the Barong Tagalog, a collared and buttoned lace shirt or a suit.

By the 19th century, due to the continuing influence of the Western culture, the rising economy, globalization, and exposure from the European fashion scene, the women's clothing began to have a change; by the 1850s, women's clothing was now full wide skirts that usually have long train rather than the simple floor length skirts, a bodice called camisa which means blouse in English and a panuelo, a big square cloth folded triangularly and worn in the Philippines like a great ruffle or collar. The attire is composed of four pieces, namely the camisa, the saya, the pañuelo (a scarf, also spelled panuelo) and the tapis.The camisa is a collarless chemise whose hem is at the waist, and is made from flimsy, translucent fabrics such as pineapple fiber and jusi. The sleeves of the camisa are similar to the so-called "angel wings", or shaped like bells that have cuffs. The pañuelo is a stiff covering for the neck, which acts as an accent piece because of embellishments added to it. The purpose of the pañuelo is related to modesty, used to cover the low-necked camisa'. The saya is a skirt shaped like a bubble with a length that begins from the waist reaching the floor.

These are usually comprised either of single or double sheets, called "panels" or dos panos (lit. "two panels/layers"); some examples are made out of seven gores or siete cuchillos (lit. "seven knives"). The tapis is a knee-length over-skirt that hugs the hips. Tapis designs may be plain, and is usually made of opaque fabrics such as muslin and the madras cloth, and also is used for the purposes of modesty as it keeps the lower torso from showing due to the thinness of the saya. Also, when going to the church or attending mass, the women usually wore a veil above their heads, similar to other Catholic countries at that time.

The men also continued to wear but a more intricate version Barong Tagalog, a collarless shirt originated from the ethnic cloth called canga. Throughout the centuries the Barong Tagalog has evolved. Buttons and collars were added, as well as intricate designs on its pina fabric and laces. Underneath the transparent Barong Tagalog is the Camisa de Chino a type of shirt, usually in white that said to have been originated from the Chinese.

The women wore this kind of fashion even after the Spanish Government  has already relinquished control to the United States. Today, this type of clothing is now called as the "Maria Clara" dress, named after the character of Maria Clara from Dr. Jose Rizal's novel Noli Me Tangere who became a symbol of the traditional Filipino woman, known as modest, elegant and conservative.

American Era (1900s–1920s) 
When the Americans came, the fashion remained the same for the first five years of the 20th century. But it has started to change and became more modern in contrast to the conservative style of the previous centuries as the Americans started to influence the modern Filipino culture.

The women then wore the Traje de Mestiza, the more modern version of the Maria Clara. It had bigger sleeves and a narrower floor length skirt with a long train called saya de cola and replaced the full wide skirt reflecting the Edwardian Fashion of the West.

By the 1920s, the style of the skirt still remained, influenced by the flapper dress; however, the wide sleeves had been flattened to butterfly sleeves (popularized by local couturier Pacita Longos), and the big pañuelo reduced its size. Such trends had gained prominence especially during the annual Manila Carnivals of the 1920s and through the 1930s. Some Filipino women who had lived in United States and in Europe wore the western 1920s fashion with loose dresses and knee length skirt.

Men wore the Americana, the suit and coat worn in the West, mostly Americans (hence the name), replacing the traditional Barong Tagalog.

Commonwealth Era and Second World War (1930s–1940s) 
By the 1930s, young adult women and children finally abandoned the typical "Traje de Mestiza" as everyday wear and started to wear floral printed dresses with mid-calf length shirts. Though many women embraced the western ideals, the typical "Traje de Mestiza" was not fully gone. The elders and middle aged women still wore the traditional dress while the young adults considered it only as a formal dress for events such as carnivals, galas, etc.

In the 1930s, the Philippines was famous for its beauty pageants and carnivals that drew tourists from around the world, and resulted in influencing the fashion and beauty standards of the Filipino women. The women wore more elaborate and intricate dresses. The "Traje de Mestiza" was still popular to the people through the 1930s. Men's fashion remained the same as they continued to wear the "Americana" suit.

When 1940s came, the Philippines saw the breaking out of World War II resulting in the shortage of tailoring shops, clothing boutiques and dressmaking factories as the country was occupied by the Japanese Empire. The austerity era started when rations were implemented and the women wore simpler clothing. The terno gradually disappeared and stopped being manufactured. Only the older people wore their old terno dresses. Clothing boutiques only sold monochromatic dresses, mostly in dark tones. The shirtwaist dresses of the previous decade also became popular in the 1940s with a simpler look.

The men's fashion still remained unchanged but became a more casual as started abandoning the coat as a casual wear, and wore it only for formal wear.

During the mid-1940s, the clothing boutiques, tailoring shops, and dressmakers stopped operation as the final chapter of the World War II occurred in the Philippines. The capital city of Manila was bombed and was left 80% destroyed, and was considered being the second most devastated capital city in World War II, next only to Warsaw.

After the war, most of the people either lost their clothes or could not find new clothes. In 1946, the country began its reparation and Manila's restoration. However, the lack of dressmakers made the fashion of the 1930s and early 1940s remain popular for the rest of the decade.

1950s

When the decade started, the country saw the rise of economy, once again giving opportunities for people to have more necessities and live in the normal life. Women remained wearing the 1940s fashion during the first five years of the decade. By the late 1950s, women started to wear dresses and with floral prints and fuller knee-length skirts. The style was inspired by Christian Dior's "New Look" collection, characterized by a below-mid-calf length, full-skirt, pointed bust, small waist, and rounded shoulder line. Summer and Day dresses became popular, as well as the pencil skirts and cardigans.

Men's fashion changed slightly as the men started wearing youthful clothing such as sweaters, colorful printed polos, pants and flannels. "Chinos" became popular as well as white tee shirt, tartan plaids. The drape cut suits remained popular for formal wear.

The Barong Tagalog became popular once again to be worn as a formal wear, popularized by the then-President Ramon Magsaysay. The Terno was rarely worn by young women everyday; however, it was still worn at formal events such as galas, national events, government parties and film festivals.

1960s

When the 1960s entered, most of the styles from the late 1950s still remained; however, due to the rise of British pop culture that spread in United States and other parts of the world, fashion started to change. A new kind of dress invented by Mary Quant, called the miniskirt, mini dresses started to become popular and mod style fashions also emerged. Hair became very stylish as the hair were styled bigger and higher with the use of hairspray. By the mid-1960s, the hemlines rose and the clothes loosened, influenced by the mod culture.

Men's fashion shifted towards a more youthful vibe, influenced by the rising Teenage culture seen in Hollywood and by various Teen-oriented Filipino films where they started wearing polos and pants, replacing the suit and coats. Suits and coats, as well as the Barong Tagalog, were now only worn during events and by the older men.

1970s
With the popularity of the hippie culture in the late 1960s, many Filipinos embraced this culture which has continued until the early seventies. At the same time, the rise of Filipino Nationalism began and both movements influenced the way people lived and dressed. The early 1970s saw women start to abandon mini-dresses for a more modest clothing such as maxi skirts. Vintage clothing from the Victorian Era of the west also became popular as long sleeves, laces, and collars became popular in dresses. Bell bottom pants started to become popular that would continue to the rest of the decade. Men also started to grow their hair long, the first time ever that such style became acceptable in post-colonial Filipino society.

Men also wore Bell bottoms often in bright colors, similar to the women. The turtle neck became popular as well as sweater vests, colorful bright patterned polos and pants.

By the mid-1970s, men started wearing t-shirts, which replaced the formal look with a more laid-back look. Denim jeans also started to emerge, as well as sweatshirts.

When the disco culture emerged, the bell bottoms became a staple. It came up with different bright colors, as well as the polos and scarfs. Women started wearing sequined dresses, mostly in miniskirts and bell bottom jeans. T-shirts also became popular for women and the footwear called bakya became popular.

1980s
Following the 1986 EDSA Revolution, Corazon Aquino favored western style power dressing and the simpler and more modest kimona in place of the terno.

Due to the power dressing movement, women, usually young adults, also started to wear clothes with shoulder pads while teenagers started wearing neon colored clothes. Miniskirts also came back in popularity. Hairstyles were also emphasized as most women had their hair curled.

Men's fashion had a shift as they started to wear brightly colored t-shirts or polo shirts and denim jeans for a casual look, throwing away the more formal look. Teenage boys also wore pastel and neon colored jackets, polos, pants, short shorts and t-shirts. Converse All-Stars shoes were also popular among the teenagers.

Colorful short shorts for both teen boys and girls were also one of the huge trends that defined the decade.

Sportswear also became popular for everyday clothing. Leggings rose to popularity as well as jogging pants, headbands and legwarmers.

By 1989, a drastic change in style emerged; a trend having oversized shirts and pants were in style, paving way to the 1990s loose fashion.

1990s
Fashion in the 1990s was a laid back version of the 1980s fashion. This decade saw the beginning of the influence of rock music to mainstream fashion. Despite being impractical for tropical weather, men started to wear dark, simple and mostly oversized clothes, moving away to the brightly colored clothes of the 1980s. Women also wore loose, simple and casual clothing such as oversized shirts, denim shorts, denim jeans, simple blouses and sneakers. Skirts weren't as popular as denim throughout the decade. 

Men's hairstyles also changed as they grew their hair longer for the first time since the decade of the 1970s. Also, a hairstyle called cachupoy was considered popular among teenage boys. It was a straight hairstyle that has a middle parting at the center, most teen celebrities sported this kind of hairstyle.

It was also the decade when people from all social classes wore the same style of clothes, with people having a hard time distinguishing who was from the upper class or from the lower class as everyone opted for a simple, laid-back style of dressing.

2000s
1990s fashion remained popular during the early years of the first decade of the 21st century. 2000s fashion was considered a mash up of different styles. In the first part of the decade, the concept of innerwear as an outerwear was popularized resulting in the popularity of spaghetti strap clothes. Men still followed the 1990s fashion with hip-hop inspired of clothing, wearing cargo pants and oversized T-shirts.

By the mid 2000s, colorful clothes began to rise again. Men started wearing flannel and checkered polos. At the end of the decade, people saw the mixture of clothing from uggboots worn with short shorts and t-shirts to dresses worn over with leggings. It was characterized by bright colors, textures, patterns and a bunch of accessories.

In the late 2000s and early 2010s, Jejemon style clothing consisting of oversized shirts with large prints and high crown hats became popular with teenagers.

2010s

Due to the development of social media, many Filipino women and men were exposed to different styles. Also due to the rising economy of the country for the first time since the 1986 People Power Revolution, as well as the constant building of shopping malls and shopping centers, many Filipinos began buying more clothes.

The early 2010s began with a continuation of some of the late-2000s fashion; however; in 2011, a change began as people started to move away from the rock influenced 2000s fashion and create a more distinctive 2010s fashion. With the rise of social media, most of the women began wearing  inspired clothes. Also, women became interested in 1960s fashion and began replicating that style. Men also began wearing preppy clothes inspired by the British boy band One Direction who rose to fame in 2010. Skinny jeans and shorts proved to be popular among the men and these came up in different colors.

In 2013, skater skirts became popular among teenage girls and they started wearing more feminine clothing.

When the mid-2010s entered, women began wearing more modest clothing as the fashion brands started to market 1950s and 1960s inspired clothing. Denim pants was replaced by skirts and leggings. Men began to wear more formal clothes.

Dresses replaced the casual t-shirts and jeans worn by the women while Chinos replaced the denim pants worn by men.

By the mid-2010s, many of the fashions from the mid-1960s and mid-1990s returned, clothing such as midi-skirts, denim jackets, knitted sweaters, boat shoes, etc. came back into fashion while fashion pieces like chokers gained prominence once again. Men's fashion also started to move away to the rock/hiphop-influenced styles of the past two decades and started to define a new style for men. 2010s hairstyles were often defined by; loose waves for women and slick-back hair for men. While beauty trends include having emphasis on the lips, and contoured cheeks, nude color palettes were also prominent for make-up.

The late 2010s saw Mindanao-influenced designs, and a resurgence of interest for ternos and their redesigns for modern applications, with 2018 hosting the first TERNOCON.

Traditional clothing by areas and regions
Ethnic clothing was worn by the members of different ethnic tribes around the country before the Spanish colonized the islands. Today, they are still often worn during gatherings, festivals, and for cultural shows.

Cordilleras

Igorot ethnic outfit
The Igorots are indigenous people from the Cordilleras. They are known for wearing a piece of clothing with intricate patterns woven by their own fellowmen. The men's clothing consists of red loincloth called wanes with tribal patterns, tattoos which is a symbol for bravery, and colorful bead necklaces. Women's clothing are usually similar to men's except that the women wear wrap-around skirt or called lufid and usually topless. In some parts of Cordilleras such as the Igorots in Benguet, women wrap their breasts with a very detailed wrap-around clothing.

Baro't Saya
The traditional Baro't Saya was worn by the lowland people in Filipinas. It includes the blouse called "baro" and a skirt called "saya". It is the Archetype of every Filipiniana dress that has evolved throughout the colonial era of the Philippines. Today, the dress represents the rural life in the Philippines.

Urban areas

Maria Clara Dress

Being the capital which is also located in the lowland Urban area, Manila people often wore more elaborate version of Baro't Saya with wide full skirts rather than the simple skirt. Throughout the 17th–18th century, this clothing also became popular to the upper and middle class Filipinos from other parts of the country, mostly urban areas such as Cebu, Iloilo, Negros Occidental and many more. Today, it is now known as the Maria Clara gown which represents the Spanish colonial history of the country as well as the aristocracy of the Filipino people.

During the American period, the design drastically changed from a wide full skirt to a more modern look and then again changed into the current Filipiniana popularized by Imelda Marcos in the 1960s. Men wore Barong Tagalog but with also a more elaborate and intricate designs.

Visayas

Kimona and Patadyong
In the islands of the Visayas regions, the Kimona represents Visayan clothing. Most Visayan lowland people wear the typical Kimona, a type of Baro't Saya blouse matching with a knee-length skirt. Kimona is typically a transparent piece of clothing made of pineapple fiber while the skirt is usually either floor-length or knee-length printed with the Patadyong pattern, hence getting the name Patadyong skirt. The dress is often accompanied with a handkerchief called tubao and is often placed above the right shoulder.

Mindanao

In Mindanao, there is large minority of the people are practicing Islam, therefore following the Islamic culture. Women wear a hijab, a long-sleeved top and a floor-length skirt, while men wear polos and pants together with a hat called taqiyah. Non Islamic people follow Visayan-like fashion.

Women's clothing
Baro't Saya (literally "Shirt and Skirt") is the Filipino style of women's clothing. Traditionally, it is composed of a blouse and a long skirt with a "panuelo". It evolved many variants, some are regional. The upper-class women wore more elaborate baro't saya sewn with beads and colorful designs. The skirt is also wider than what lower classes wore.

These types of clothing that are "simple yet functional" that have both indigenous Filipino qualities and Spanish influence started to become prominent during the 16th-century in the Philippines.

Such clothing, through the innovation of modern-day Filipino fashion designers, can be worn in the Philippines for formal occasions and office uniforms. These "national clothes" can be made from materials such as piña, jusi, abaca, and Mindanao silk.

Men's clothing
Barong Tagalog is a clothing worn by men. Having originated in Luzon, this clothing is may be made of pineapple fiber and is translucent, where an undershirt has to be worn together with dark pants.
The "coat" or "suit", locally known as the "Amerikana" or Americana (literally "American") was another type of clothing introduced to the Philippines by the Americans. Worn with a tie, it is used for formal occasions.

Fashion designers

Notable Filipino fashion designers include Pitoy Moreno, Ito Curata, Inno Sotto, Rajo Laurel, Kermit Tesoro, Beatriz Tesoro, Christian Espiritu, Auggie Cordero, Monique Lhuillier, Ezra Santos, Mich Dulce, Francis Libiran, Oliver Tolentino, Josie Natori, and Michael Cinco. Moreno was known to design and create dresses for Philippine First Ladies. A newly emerging Filipino designer is Wolfram Philippines who introduced iconic Filipino wardrobes through the pop group BGYO.

Popular brands

Filipino brands
Philippine brand clothing that are popular in and outside the Philippines include Bench, Onesimus, Michel André,  Penshoppe, Loalde, Kamiseta (literally "T-shirt"), Maldita and Bayo.

International brands
Brands from abroad that are popular in the Philippines include Giordano, Levi's, Nike, The Gap, Banana Republic and Guess.

 First tier includes top designer's labels that are not common to average Filipinos, including Hermès, Bottega Veneta, Louis Vuitton, Givenchy, Burberry, Prada, Gucci.
 Second tier showcases brands that are affordable to average Filipinos which include Ralph Lauren, Balenciaga, Michael Kors, Nine West, Kate Spade, Longchamp and Fendi.
 Third tier are the high street brands that are a bit expensive for average Filipinos, including Comme des Garcons, Lacoste, Diesel, Marks & Spencer, Tommy Hilfiger, Kenneth Cole.
 Fourth tier are affordable brands that are good quality, which includes, Uniqlo, Mango, Zara, and Aldo".
 Fifth tier are brands that are very much affordable to an average Filipino and usually of a lower quality, Forever 21, H&M, and Guess''.

See also
Philippine Fashion Week
Project Runway Philippines
2010s in Philippine Fashion
Buntal hat
Rayadillo

References

External links
Philippines' makes fashion history; breaks world record by Dinah Manzano

Philippine culture